The Attorney General of Rhode Island is the chief legal advisor of the Government of the State of Rhode Island and oversees the State of Rhode Island Department of Law.  The attorney general is elected every four years. The current Attorney General is Peter F. Neronha.

History of the Rhode Island attorneys general

In 1643, Roger Williams obtained a patent (charter) from the English Parliament.  The towns of Providence and Warwick elected a Chief Officer under the authority of this Parliamentary Patent of 1643.  In 1647, the towns of Newport, Portsmouth, Providence, and Warwick formed a united colony under the Parliamentary Patent.  In May 1650, the offices of "Attorney General for the Colonie" and "Solicitor" were created.

List of attorneys general of Rhode Island

Attorney General under the Patent of 1643

William Dyer:	May 1650 – 1651

Solicitor under the Patent of 1643

Hugh Built:	May 1650 – 1651

Attorney General after the Coddington Commission

John Easton, of Newport:	May 1653 – May 1654 (Attorney General only for Portsmouth and Newport following the repeal of the Coddington Commission, and before the re-unification of the four towns into a single government)

Attorneys general under the Patent of 1643

John Cranston, of Newport	May 1654 – May 1656
John Easton, of Newport	May 1656 – May 1657
John Greene, Jr. of Warwick 	May 1657 – May 1660
John Easton, of Newport 	May 1660 – May 1663

Attorneys general under the Royal Charter of 1663

John Sanford, of Portsmouth	May 1663 – November 1664
John Easton, of Newport	1664–1670
John Sanford, of Portsmouth 	1670–1671
Joseph Torrey, of Newport 	1671–1672
John Easton, of Newport 	1672–1674
Peter Easton, of Newport 	1674–1676
Weston Clarke, of Newport 	1676–1677
Edward Richmond, of Newport	1677–1680
Weston Clarke, of Newport 	1680–1681
Edmund Calverly, of Warwick 	1681–1682
John Pococke, of Newport 	1684–1685
Weston Clarke, of Newport 	1685–1686
John Pococke, of Newport	1684–1685
Weston Clarke, of Newport 	1685–1686
John Williams, of Newport 	1686–1689
John Pococke, of Newport	May 1690 – ????
John Smith, of Warwick	        May 1696 – 1698
John Pococke, of Newport 	1698–1700
John Rhodes, of Warwick 	1700–1701
John Pococke, of Newport	1701–1702
Nathaniel Dyre, of Newport	1702–1704
Joseph Sheffield, of Newport	1704–1706
Simon Smith, of Warwick 	1706–1712
Richard Ward, of Newport 	1712–1713
John Hammett, of Newport 	1713–1714
Weston Clarke, of Newport 	1714–1721
Henry Bull, of Newport 	1721–1722
Daniel Updike, of North Kingstown	1722–1732
James Honeyman, Jr., of Newport 	1732–1740

King's attorneys

James Honeyman, Jr., of Newport  	1741–1743
John Wanton, of Providence County 	1741–1742
Daniel Updike, of King's County	1741–1743
John Andrew, of Providence County 	1742–1743

Attorneys general

Daniel Updike, of North Kingstown	1746–1747
Augustus Johnston, of Newport 	1758–1766
Oliver Arnold, of Providence 	1766–1771
Henry Marchant, of Newport	1772–1776 (Independent)
William Channing, of Newport	1777–1786 (Country)
Henry Goodwin, of Newport 	1787–1788 (Country)
David Howell, of Providence 	1789 (PA)
Daniel Updike, of North Kingstown	1790
William Channing, of Newport	1791–1793 (Country)
Ray Greene, of Providence	1794–1796 (Federalist)
James Burrill, Jr., of Providence 	1797–1813 (Federalist)
Samuel W. Bridgham, of Providence	1814–1816 (Federalist)
Henry Bowen, of Providence 	1817–1818 (Democratic-Republican)
Dutee J. Pearce, of Newport 	1819–1824 (Democratic-Republican)
Albert C. Greene, of East Greenwich	1825–1842 (Whig)

Attorneys general under the Constitution of Rhode Island (1843-present)

References

External links
 Rhode Island Attorney General official website
 Rhode Island Attorney General articles at ABA Journal
 News and Commentary at FindLaw
 Rhode Island General Laws at Law.Justia.com
 U.S. Supreme Court Opinions - "Cases with title containing: State of Rhode Island" at FindLaw
 Rhode Island Bar Association
 Rhode Island Attorney General Peter Kilmartin profile at National Association of Attorneys General
 Press releases at Rhode Island Attorney General

Rhode Island Attorneys General
Attorneys General
Attorney General
1650 establishments in Rhode Island